OCAS or Ocas may refer to:

 Obstacle Collision Avoidance System, audio visual beacons designed to alert pilots in immediate danger of flying into an obstacle
 Ontario College Application Service, a non-profit corporation
 Oberlin College of Arts & Sciences, a private liberal arts college

See also 
 Oca (disambiguation)